Cognitive restructuring (CR) is a psychotherapeutic process of learning to identify and dispute irrational or maladaptive thoughts known as cognitive distortions, such as all-or-nothing thinking (splitting), magical thinking, overgeneralization, magnification, and emotional reasoning, which are commonly associated with many mental health disorders. CR employs many strategies, such as Socratic questioning, thought recording, and guided imagery, and is used in many types of therapies, including cognitive behavioral therapy (CBT) and rational emotive behaviour therapy (REBT). A number of studies demonstrate considerable efficacy in using CR-based therapies.

Overview
Cognitive restructuring involves four steps:
 Identification of problematic cognitions known as "automatic thoughts" (ATs) which are dysfunctional or negative views of the self, world, or future based upon already existing beliefs about oneself, the world, or the future 
 Identification of the cognitive distortions in the ATs 
 Rational disputation of ATs with the Socratic method
 Development of a rational rebuttal to the ATs

There are six types of automatic thoughts:
 Self-evaluated thoughts
 Thoughts about the evaluations of others
 Evaluative thoughts about the other person with whom they are interacting
 Thoughts about coping strategies and behavioral plans
 Thoughts of avoidance
 Any other thoughts that were not categorized

Clinical applications
Cognitive restructuring has been used to help individuals experiencing a variety of psychiatric conditions, including depression, substance abuse disorders, anxiety disorders collectively, bulimia, social phobia, borderline personality disorder, attention deficit hyperactivity disorder (ADHD), and problem gambling.

When utilizing cognitive restructuring in rational emotive therapy (RET), the emphasis is on two central notions: (1) thoughts affect human emotion as well as behavior and (2) irrational beliefs are mainly responsible for a wide range of disorders. RET also classifies four types of irrational beliefs: dire necessity, feeling awful, cannot stand something, and self-condemnation. It is described as cognitive-emotional retraining. The rationale used in cognitive restructuring attempts to strengthen the client's belief that (1) "self-talk" can influence performance, and (2) in particular self-defeating thoughts or negative self-statements can cause emotional distress and interfere with performance, a process that then repeats again in a cycle. Mood repair strategies are implemented in cognitive restructuring in hopes of contributing to a cessation of the negative cycle.

When utilizing cognitive restructuring in cognitive behavioral therapy (CBT), it is combined with psychoeducation, monitoring, in vivo experience, imaginal exposure, behavioral activation, and homework assignments to achieve remission. The cognitive behavioral approach is said to consist of three core techniques: cognitive restructuring, training in coping skills, and problem solving.

Applications within therapy

There are many methods used in cognitive restructuring, which usually involve identifying and labelling distorted thoughts, such as "all or none thinking, disqualifying the positive, mental filtering, jumping to conclusions, catastrophizing, emotional reasoning, should statements, and personalization." The following lists methods commonly used in cognitive restructuring: 
Socratic questioning
Thought recording
Identifying cognitive errors
Examining the evidence (pro-con analysis or cost-benefits analysis)
Understanding idiosyncratic meaning/semantic techniques
Labeling distortions
Decatastrophizing
Reattribution
Cognitive rehearsal
Guided imagery
Listing rational alternatives
Rational emotive behavior therapy (REBT) includes awfulizing, when a person causes themselves disturbance by labelling an upcoming situation as 'awful', rather than envisaging how the situation may actually unfold, and Must-ing, when a person places a false demand on themselves that something 'must' happen (e.g. 'I must get an A in this exam'.)

Criticism

Critics of cognitive restructuring claim that the process of challenging dysfunctional thoughts will "teach clients to become better suppressors and avoiders of their unwanted thoughts" and that cognitive restructuring shows less immediate improvement because real-world practice is often required. Other criticisms include that the approach is mechanistic and impersonal and that the relationship between therapist and client is irrelevant. Neil Jacobson's component analysis of cognitive behavioural therapy (CBT), claims that the cognitive restructuring component is unnecessary, at least with depression. He argues that it is the behavioural activation components of CBT that are effective in giving therapy, not cognitive restructuring, as delivered by cognitive behavioural therapy. Others also argue that it's not necessary to challenge thoughts with cognitive restructuring.

See also
 Cognitive science
 Cognitive psychology

References

External links 
 A free Thinking Matters Facilitator Manual
 National Institute of Corrections
 An Overview of Cognitive-behavioral Group Therapy for Social Phobia 
 Cognitive Restructuring - ACCI's list of erroneous beliefs of the criminal mind.
 Cognitive Restructuring Techniques - as pioneered by Albert Ellis, Aaron Beck, and others.
 Cognitive restructuring worksheets - Tools that therapists use to help guide cognitive restructuring

Cognitive therapy